Stephen Banville (born 5 December 1984) is an Irish sportsperson.  He plays hurling with his local club Shelmaliers and has been a member of the Wexford senior hurling team since 2008. He has also been part of the Wexford football team. He is an English teacher.

References

1984 births
Living people
Dual players
Wexford inter-county hurlers
Wexford inter-county Gaelic footballers
Leinster inter-provincial hurlers
Shelmaliers hurlers